Frederik Ludvig Christian Bergmann Larsen (12 October 1839 in Randers – 19 April 1916 in Hadsten), better known as Doctor Larsen, was a famous Danish doctor. In the book, "Jyske byer og deres mænd" [Cities and People from Jutland] from 1917, he is mentioned as "miracle doctor", known by people in the whole Jutland.

References

1839 births
1916 deaths
People from Randers
People from Hadsten
19th-century Danish physicians